The Allgäu (Standard German: , also Allgovia) is a region in Swabia in southern Germany. It covers the south of Bavarian Swabia, southeastern Baden-Württemberg, and parts of Austria. The region stretches from the pre-alpine lands up to the Alps. The main rivers flowing through the Allgäu are the Lech and Iller. Allgäu is not an administrative unit.

The alpine regions of the Allgäu rise over 2,000 metres in elevation and are popular for winter skiing. 
The Allgovian area is notable for its beautiful landscapes and is popular for vacations and therapeutic stays. It is well known in Germany for its farm produce, especially dairy products including Hirtenkäse ("herdsman's cheese") and Bergkäse ("mountain cheese").

Besides tourism and dairy products, another important economic sector is the building of industrial equipment and machines. Fendt tractors, developed and produced in Marktoberdorf are one of the most famous products of the region. The castle of Neuschwanstein in Hohenschwangau is in the eastern part of the Allgäu.

The Allgäu is dominated in the south by the Allgäu Alps, which are not part of the Allgäu themselves. The Allgäu is formed mainly by glaciers and glacial debris. Many hills and lakes are remnants of former glaciers.

Gallery

Notable people 
 Michael Bredl (1916–1999), a singer and collector of traditional German Volksmusik
 Rainer W. Bussmann (born 1967), ethnobotanist and vegetation ecologist

References

External links 

Official tourist information 
Non-commercial Allgäu Information 
Alpine Club Oy/Allgäu 
Recipes from Allgäu 

Regions of Baden-Württemberg
Geography of Bavaria